Major-General Malcolm Neynoe MacLeod  (23 May 1882 – 1 August 1969) was Director General of the Ordnance Survey from 1935 to 1943.

In 1935 he started the retriangulation of Great Britain, an immense task which involved erecting concrete triangulation pillars (trig points) on prominent (often inaccessible) hilltops throughout Britain. As well as being an immense physical task, it was also an extremely complex mathematical undertaking. MacLeod can fairly be said to be the creator of the Ordnance Survey in its modern form.

MacLeod was commissioned in the Royal Engineers in 1900, serving in India from 1902 until 1914. During World War I he commanded the 4th Field Survey Battalion and was awarded the MC in the 1917 New Year Honours. He became Chief Instructor at the School of Artillery, Larkhill in 1920, serving until 1923 when he moved to the Ordnance Survey. After attending the Staff College, Quetta. he was Director-General of the Ordnance Survey in 1935, retiring in 1943.

References

Bibliography
Yolande Hodson, 2004, 'MacLeod, Malcolm Neynoe (1882–1969)', Oxford Dictionary of National Biography. Oxford: Oxford University Press.

External links 
Papers relating to Malcolm MacLeod
Generals of World War II

1882 births
1969 deaths
British cartographers
Royal Engineers officers
British Army personnel of World War I
Place of birth missing
Recipients of the Military Cross
British Army generals of World War II
British Army major generals
Graduates of the Staff College, Quetta